Kenneth is an extinct town in Jefferson Township, Cass County, Indiana.

History
Kenneth was a whistle stop on the railroad. A post office was established at Kenneth in 1892, and remained in operation until it was discontinued in 1929.

Geography

References

Unincorporated communities in Cass County, Indiana
Unincorporated communities in Indiana
1929 disestablishments in Indiana
1892 establishments in Indiana